Kathleen Collins (1942–1988) was African-American writer, filmmaker, and educator.

Kathleen Collins may also refer to:
 Kathleen Collins (actress) (1903–1994), American silent film actress
 Bo Derek (Mary Cathleen Collins, born 1956), American actress, credited as Kathleen Collins in the 1981 film Fantasies
 Kathleen Collins (scientist), American biophysicist and professor